Balizia elegans is a species of flowering plants in the family Fabaceae. It is a tree in the emergent layer of the tropical rainforest of South America (Bolivia, Brazil, Costa Rica and Honduras).

References

External links

Balizia elegans at The Plant List

Mimosoids
Plants described in 1996
Flora of Bolivia
Flora of Brazil
Flora of Costa Rica
Flora of Honduras
Taxa named by Adolpho Ducke